Red River Brewing Company may refer to:

Companies
Red River Brewing Company (Louisiana), brewing company in Shreveport, Louisiana 
Red River Brewing Company (New Mexico), brewing company in Red River, New Mexico